Horrie Riley (10 September 1902 – 8 February 1970) was an Australian rules footballer who played with Sturt in the SAFL.

Football
Despite being one of the smaller players in the league, Victorian born Horrie Riley was particularly strong in the air.

He won the 1923 Magarey Medal, was a member of Sturt's premiership side in 1926 and represented South Australia 20 times at interstate football.

When he retired he 1930 he had played a total of 122 games.
 
Riley has a place in the back pocket in Sturt's official 'Team of the Century'.

See also
 1927 Melbourne Carnival

Footnotes

External links 
 

1902 births
1970 deaths
Australian rules footballers from Melbourne
Australian Rules footballers: place kick exponents
Magarey Medal winners
Sturt Football Club players
South Australian Football Hall of Fame inductees